Father Edward Albert Hughes (August 28, 1918 - October 12, 1980) was a Roman Catholic priest who served as an assistant pastor from June 16, 1948 to June 18, 1960 at St. James Church in Mt. Rainier, Maryland. He was best known for his participation in the Exorcism of Roland Doe.

Life 

Hughes participated in an exorcism in 1949 at the Georgetown University Hospital on an anonymous thirteen-year-old boy, where he was allegedly injured when the boy broke out of his restraints.

William Peter Blatty was inspired by a newspaper article about this case to write his novel The Exorcist.

In 1973, Father Hughes returned to St. James Church and later  became pastor at St Matthias until his death of a heart attack on October 12, 1980.

References 

Catholic exorcists
1918 births
1980 deaths
20th-century American Roman Catholic priests
American exorcists